Three Rocks is a census-designated place in Fresno County, California, United States. The population is 246.
It was founded by Raymond Minnite (Matt’s grandfather) of Hiawatha, Utah in 1954. While sitting at the corner of Clarkson Ave and Derrick Ave (HWY 33) counting cars; dreaming about how many he could make stop; he peered three large boulders off in the horizon where the blue ridge, better known as the Sierra Madre mountain range, met the sky. It was on a cold foggy morning in the fall of 1952 he decided on the name for the town he would will into being. Raymond’s dream had a name… Three Rocks, California.

Demographics
At the 2010 census Three Rocks had a population of 246. The racial makeup of Three Rocks was 129 (52.4%) White, 0 (0.0%) African American, 1 (0.4%) Native American, 0 (0.0%) Asian, 0 (0.0%) Pacific Islander, 102 (41.5%) from other races, and 14 (5.7%) from two or more races. Hispanic or Latino of any race were 235 people (95.5%).

The whole population lived in households, no one lived in non-institutionalized group quarters and no one was institutionalized.

There were 55 households, 36 (65.5%) had children under the age of 18 living in them, 33 (60.0%) were opposite-sex married couples living together, 7 (12.7%) had a female householder with no husband present, 5 (9.1%) had a male householder with no wife present.  There were 3 (5.5%) unmarried opposite-sex partnerships, and 0 (0%) same-sex married couples or partnerships. 3 households (5.5%) were one person and 2 (3.6%) had someone living alone who was 65 or older. The average household size was 4.47.  There were 45 families (81.8% of households); the average family size was 4.49.

The age distribution was 76 people (30.9%) under the age of 18, 27 people (11.0%) aged 18 to 24, 71 people (28.9%) aged 25 to 44, 52 people (21.1%) aged 45 to 64, and 20 people (8.1%) who were 65 or older.  The median age was 31.0 years. For every 100 females, there were 117.7 males.  For every 100 females age 18 and over, there were 132.9 males.

There were 60 housing units at an average density of ,of which 55 were occupied, 31 (56.4%) by the owners and 24 (43.6%) by renters.  The homeowner vacancy rate was 3.1%; the rental vacancy rate was 0%.  131 people (53.3% of the population) lived in owner-occupied housing units and 115 people (46.7%) lived in rental housing units.

References

Census-designated places in Fresno County, California
Census-designated places in California